Events in 2018 in anime. The final full year of the Heisei era.

Releases

Films
A list of anime that debuted in theaters between January 1 and December 31, 2018.

Television series
A list of anime television series that debuted between January 1 and December 31, 2018.

Original net animations
A list of original net animations that debuted between January 1 and December 31, 2018.

Original video animations
A list of original video animations that debuted between January 1 and December 31, 2018.

See also
2018 in Japanese television
2018 in South Korea
2018 in television

References

External links 
Japanese animated works of the year, listed in the IMDb

Years in anime
anime
anime
Anime
2018-related lists
Culture-related lists by year
Culture-related timelines by year